Progress is an album released by Rx Bandits on July 17, 2001 through Drive-Thru Records.

The LP was originally titled Artificial Intelligence and the Fall of Technology.

The album was recorded during a tumultuous time in the band's lineup.  Several members had left the band after the recording of Halfway between Here and There, though former saxophonist Noah Gaffney contributed on the song "Anyone But You."  Gaffney's position was eventually filled by saxophonist Steve Borth, formerly of East Bay ska-punk band Link 80.

After the departure of James Salamone on bass, the band had many temporary replacements, including Johnny Tsagakis, drummer Chris Tsagakis' younger brother.  Joe Troy, a longtime friend of Embree who helped write the song "What If?", eventually joined the band as a permanent bass player.

Steve Choi, formerly of The Chinkees, also became a full member playing guitar and keyboards. Choi had also played keyboards on the demos that the band made for Progress, but when it came time to record, they decided to have Rich Zahniser of The Hippos play on the album, because at the time he was touring with the band. Former Jeffries Fan Club trombonist Chris Colonnier also played with the band at times in the same role as Zahniser. Progress was ranked #207 on the greatest albums in 2001.

Shortly after the release of Progress, Chris Sheets joined as a second trombone player. Not long after that, Rich Balling quit the band.

The album spawned the band's first music video for the song "Analog Boy." The band wouldn't make a second music video for another 5 years, until the title track of 2006's ...And the Battle Begun.

Track listing
All songs written by Matt Embree, except where noted.
 " – 0:28" – 0:28
 "VCG³" (Rich Balling) – 3:44
 "Consequential Apathy" – 2:36
 "Analog Boy" – 4:13
 "Get" – 2:42
 "All the Time" – 3:55
 "In All Rwanda's Glory" – 3:35
 "Babylon" – 3:20
 "Who Would've Thought" – 3:15
 "Status" – 3:28
 "Anyone But You" (Rich Balling) – 3:03
 "Nugget" – 4:59
 "Progress" – 3:28
 "Nothing Sacred" – 2:58
 "Infection" – 6:53

Personnel
 Rich Balling – trombone, vocals
 Matt Embree – vocals, guitar
 James Salomone – bass
 Chris Tsagakis – drums

Additional musicians
 Kate Carter – violin, viola
 Alan Elliot – clavinet
 Christopher Fudurich – aural chaos
 Noah Gaffney – saxophone
 Brad Lindsay – cello
 David Vokoun – double bass
 Rich Zahniser – Hammond B3, trombone

References

Rx Bandits albums
2001 albums
Drive-Thru Records albums